Miloš Crnomarković (born 15 September 1993) is a Serbian professional footballer who plays as a left-back for First League of FBiH club Orašje.

Honours
Mladost Lučani
Serbian First League: 2013–14

References

External links
Miloš Crnomarković at footballdatabase.eu
Miloš Crnomarković profile at utakmica.rs

1993 births
Living people
Sportspeople from Pančevo
Association football midfielders
Serbian footballers
Serbian First League players
Serbian SuperLiga players
First League of the Federation of Bosnia and Herzegovina players
First League of the Republika Srpska players
FK Sinđelić Beograd players
FK Timok players
FK Mladost Lučani players
FK Sloboda Užice players
FK BSK Borča players
FK Železničar Pančevo players
NK Jedinstvo Bihać players
FK Sloboda Mrkonjić Grad players
HNK Orašje players